"The Sorcerer's Apprentice" is a poem by Johann Wolfgang von Goethe written in 1797. The poem is a ballad in 14 stanzas.

Story
The poem begins as an old sorcerer departs his workshop, leaving his apprentice with chores to perform. Tired of fetching water by pail, the apprentice enchants a broom to do the work for him, using magic in which he is not fully trained. The floor is soon awash with water, and the apprentice realizes that he cannot stop the broom because he does not know the magic required to do so.

The apprentice splits the broom in two with an axe, but each piece becomes a whole broom that takes up a pail and continues fetching water, now at twice the speed. At this increased pace, the entire room quickly begins to flood. When all seems lost, the old sorcerer returns and quickly breaks the spell. The poem concludes with the old sorcerer's statement that only a master should invoke powerful spirits.

German culture
Goethe's  is well known in the German-speaking world. The lines in which the apprentice implores the returning sorcerer to help him with the mess he created have turned into a cliché, especially the line "Die Geister, die ich rief" ("The spirits that I summoned"), a simplified version of one of Goethe's lines "Die ich rief, die Geister, / Werd' ich nun nicht los" - "The spirits that I summoned / I now cannot rid myself of again", which is often used to describe someone who summons help or allies that the individual cannot control, especially in politics.

Analysis
The story of the Sorcerer's Apprentice is classified in the Aarne–Thompson–Uther Index as ATU 325 (The Magician and his Pupil) or ATU 325* (The Apprentice and the Ghosts). The tale assumes two formats, mostly:

The first type: a father sells his son to a sorcerer-type character (magician, warlock, wizard). The boy learns to shapeshift, escapes the magician's workshop and returns to his father. They both concoct a plan to earn money and scam people: the man shall sell the boy in equine form. The magician notices the trick and buys the horse-boy. What follows is a shape-shifting duel between magician and apprentice, and the apprentice wins by shapeshifting into a fox and eating the magician in rooster shape.
The second type: the father is absent from the story. The boy apprentices himself to the sorcerer, learns his tricks and escapes. With the help of a princess, the apprentice defeats the magician in a shapeshifiting duel.

Folklorist Stith Thompson suggested an Asian origin for the tale, supposedly India. He also remarked on the popularity of the tale, which has spread throughout Asia and Europe, to Africa and the Americas.

Hasan M. El-Shamy stated that an old form of the tale type appears in the Tale of Setne Khamwas and Si-Osire, as the episode of  a confrontation between two sorcerers. Further studies indicate that the motif of the "transformation combat" between two sorcerous characters shows great antiquity.

Similar stories 
Some versions of the tale differ from Goethe's, and in some versions the sorcerer is angry at the apprentice and in some even expels the apprentice for causing the mess. In other versions, the sorcerer is a bit amused at the apprentice and he simply chides his apprentice about the need to be able to properly control such magic once summoned. The sorcerer's anger with the apprentice, which appears in both the Greek Philopseudes and the film Fantasia, does not appear in Goethe's "Der Zauberlehrling".

Philopseudes
Lover of Lies is a short frame story by Lucian, written c. AD 150. The narrator, Tychiades, is visiting the house of a sick and elderly friend, Eucrates, where he has an argument about the reality of the supernatural. Eucrates and several other visitors tell various tales, intended to convince him that supernatural phenomena are real. Each story in turn is either rebutted or ridiculed by Tychiades.

Eucrates recounts a tale extremely similar to Goethe's "Zauberlehrling", which had supposedly happened to him in his youth. It is, indeed, the oldest known variation of this tale type. There are several differences:
 The sorcerer is, instead, an Egyptian mystic – a priest of Isis called Pancrates.
 Eucrates is not an apprentice, but a companion who eavesdrops on Pancrates casting his spell.
 Although a broom is listed as one of the items that can be animated by the spell, Eucrates actually uses a pestle. (Pancrates also sometimes used the bar of a door.)

Other related stories
Similar themes (such as the power of magic or technology turning against the insufficiently wise person invoking it) are found in many traditions and works of art. Comparative mythologist Patrice Lajoye argues for a parallel between the Brythonic legend of Taliesin and a Russian fairy tale, Le savoir magique, collected by Alexander Afanasyev with both stories being classified as ATU 325. As referenced by Joseph Jacobs in his English Fairy Tales, Joseph Tunison (1849–1916) analysed several apocryphal medieval tales of Roman poet Virgil, including one where Virgil summons and banishes an evil entity. Scholarship acknowledges the popularity of the tale type in Yiddish folklore.

17th-century French author Eustace le Noble also wrote a literary variant of the tale type with L'apprenti magicien.

In mythology
 Midas
 Golem
 Abhimanyu in Chakravyuha in the Mahabharata
 The Sañjīva Jātaka story about the boastful pupil who is killed by the tiger he brought to life with a spell, without yet being taught the counter-spell by his teacher.

In folk and fairy tales
 "Maestro Lattantio and His Apprentice Dionigi"
 "The Master and his Pupil"
 "The Thief and His Master"
 "Sweet Porridge"
 "The Magic Book"
 "Farmer Weathersky"
 Faust
 Krabat

In literature
 Strega Nona
 Frankenstein
 "The Monkey's Paw"
 The Man Who Could Work Miracles (and numerous other works by H. G. Wells)

Other uses

The animated 1940 Disney film Fantasia popularized the story from Goethe's poem, and the 1897 Paul Dukas symphonic poem based on it, in one of eight animated shorts based on classical music. In the piece, which retains the title "The Sorcerer's Apprentice", Mickey Mouse plays the apprentice, and the story follows Goethe's original closely, except that the sorcerer (Yen Sid, or Disney backwards) is stern and angry with his apprentice when he saves him. Fantasia popularized Goethe's story to a worldwide audience. The segment proved so popular that it was repeated, in its original form, in the sequel Fantasia 2000.

Literary adaptations of the tale include several fiction and nonfiction books, including the novel The Sorcerer's Apprentice (1910) by  Hanns Heinz Ewers, and Christopher Bulis's novel The Sorcerer's Apprentice (1995) based on the TV series Doctor Who. Nonfiction books with this title include The Sorcerer's Apprentice: A Journey Through Africa (1948) by Elspeth Huxley, and the travel book Sorcerer's Apprentice (1998) by Tahir Shah.

Karl Marx and Friedrich Engels alluded to Goethe's poem in The Communist Manifesto (1848), comparing modern bourgeois society to "the sorcerer who is no longer able to control the powers of the nether world whom he has called up by his spells."

"The Sorcerer's Apprentice" is a 1962 episode of Alfred Hitchcock Presents featuring Brandon deWilde as mentally-troubled youth Hugo, coveting the magic wand of a kindly magician.

The poem's story is alluded to in several episodes of the fairy-tale drama Once Upon a Time, especially in "The Apprentice" (2014). A variation of the Dukas piece also plays in certain scenes. The apprentice himself is a recurring character, while the sorcerer is shown to be Merlin.

The film The Sorcerer's Apprentice (2010) features a scene based on Goethe's poem (and the Fantasia version).

"Top Secret Apprentice", a segment of the Tiny Toon Adventures episode broadcast on February 1, 1991, is a modern version of the story, with Buster Bunny messing around with Bugs Bunny's cartoon scenery machine and getting into trouble.

The Fantasia version appears in the video game series Kingdom Hearts (2002), with the sorcerer Yen Sid serving as an adviser to the heroes, teaching Mickey, Sora, and Riku the Keyblade skills needed to guard the universe from his former friend Xehanort's plan. A world based on the Fantasia version also appears throughout the series, serving as Yen Sid's home.

The Magic: The Gathering playing card Sorcerer's Broom from Throne of Eldraine references the story and the replicating nature of the broom.

See also 
 Sorcerer's Apprentice Syndrome
 Sweet Porridge
 The Master and his Pupil

References

Further reading
 
 
 Cosquin, Emmanuel. Les Mongols et leur prétendu rôle dans la transmission des contes indiens vers l'Occident européen: étude de folk-lore comparé sur l'introduction du "Siddhikûr" et le conte du "Magicien et son apprenti". Imprimerie nouvelle G. Clouzot, 1913.

External links 

 Volume 3 of Fowler's translations of Lucian, from Project Gutenberg
 Modern English translation from 2013 by Katrin Gygax
 The Sorcerer's Apprentice from Fantasia (first part) and second part

1797 poems
Poetry by Johann Wolfgang von Goethe
Wizards in fiction
ATU 300-399